The Fifty-first Oklahoma Legislature was a meeting of the legislative branch of the government of Oklahoma, composed of the Senate and the House of Representatives. State legislators  met at the Oklahoma State Capitol in Oklahoma City from January 2, 2007 to January 3, 2009, during the first two years of the second term of Governor Brad Henry. A tie in the number of seats held by Republicans and Democrats in the Oklahoma Senate resulted in bipartisan leadership. Republicans held the majority of seats in the Oklahoma House of Representatives.

Dates of sessions
Organizational day: January 2, 2007
First regular session: February 3, 2007 – May 25, 2007
Second regular session: February 4, 2008 – May 30, 2008

Previous: 50th Legislature • Next: 52nd Legislature

Party Affiliation

Senate

House of Representatives

Events

Republican Senator Nancy Riley switched to the Democratic Party in the summer of 2006.
Historic tie created in the number of seats held by Republicans and Democrats in the Oklahoma Senate.
Lance Cargill resigned as Speaker of the Oklahoma House of Representatives.

Major legislation

Enacted
Immigration- HB1804, the Oklahoma Taxpayer and Citizen Protection Act of 2007:
restricted the ability of illegal immigrants to obtain government IDs or public assistance;
gave police authority to check the immigration status of anyone arrested;
made it a felony for U.S. citizens to knowingly provide shelter, transportation or employment to illegal immigrants.
Ethics - HB2196 prohibited lobbyists from making campaign contributions to state legislators during the legislative session.
Roads and bridges - HB2272 created a $300 million bond package for roads and bridge maintenance and repair.

Failed
Lawsuit reform - HB 2458 would have enacted lawsuit reforms, but was vetoed by Governor Brad Henry.

Leadership

Senate
 President of the Senate: Jari Askins (D-Duncan)
 President pro tempore: Mike Morgan (D-Stillwater)
 Co-President pro tempore: Glenn Coffee (R-Oklahoma City)

Democratic caucus
 Co-Floor Leader: Charlie Laster
 Co-Assistant Floor Leader: Jay Paul Gumm
 Co-Assistant Floor Leader: Jeff Rabon
 Whip: Susan Paddack
 Whip: Nancy Riley
 Whip: Charles Wyrick
 Caucus Chair: Kenneth Corn

Republican caucus
 Co-Floor Leader: Owen Laughin
 Co-Assistant Floor Leader: Randy Brogdon
 Co-Assistant Floor Leader: Mike Mazzei
 Whip: Kathleen Wilcoxson
 Whip: Cliff Branan
 Whip: Clark Jolley
 Caucus Chair: Todd Lamb

House of Representatives
 Speaker: Lance Cargill
 Speaker Pro Tempore: Gus Blackwell

Republican caucus
 Majority Floor Leader: Greg Piatt
 Caucus Chairman: John Wright
 Majority Whip: Rob Johnson

Democratic caucus
 Democratic Floor Leader: Danny Morgan
 Democratic Floor Leader: James Covey
 Whip: Terry Harrison
 Caucus Chairman: Chuck Hoskin

Members

Senate

House of Representatives

See also
Oklahoma state elections, 2006

References

Oklahoma legislative sessions
Oklahoma
Oklahoma
2007 in Oklahoma
2008 in Oklahoma